Shwegyaung may refer to several places in Burma:

Shwegyaung (24°26"N 95°29"E), Banmauk
Shwegyaung (24°25"N 95°46"E), Banmauk
Shwegyaung (24°21"N 95°51"E), Banmauk
Shwegyaung, Bhamo